Pyrausta tapaishanensis is a moth in the family Crambidae. It was described by Aristide Caradja in 1939. It is found in Shaanxi, China.

References

Moths described in 1939
tapaishanensis
Moths of Asia